All Hands was a monthly published magazine of the United States Navy for its sailors. It had been published since August 1922 under different names; the current title was established in 1945.  Its last issue was published on December 2011, although it continues to be published online.

The magazine was free of charge. The publisher was the former Naval Media Center in Washington, D.C.  Shortly before the magazine's demise, publication operations moved to Defense Media Activity in Fort George G. Meade, Maryland in August, 2011.

All Hands Magazine was brought back as a digital web-based publication in February 2013.  It can be read online.

References

External links

All Hands (USN), Archive

Monthly magazines published in the United States
Online magazines published in the United States
Defunct magazines published in the United States
Magazines established in 1922
Magazines disestablished in 2011
Magazines published in Maryland
Magazines published in Washington, D.C.
Military magazines published in the United States
Online magazines with defunct print editions
Publications of the United States government
United States Navy traditions
Free magazines